Mack Easley (October 14, 1916 – March 1, 2006) was an American politician and judge in New Mexico.

Early life and education 
Easley was born in Tahlequah, Oklahoma. He moved to Hobbs, New Mexico in 1947 after graduating from the University of Oklahoma College of Law.

Career 
After serving as assistant District Attorney, he was elected to the New Mexico House of Representatives, where he served five terms from 1951 to 1953 and 1955 to 1963. He also served Speaker of the House. In 1962, he was elected Lieutenant Governor of New Mexico and served for two terms (1963–1967) with Governor Jack Campbell. After returning to Hobbs to become its new State Senator, he was appointed District Judge. In 1975, Governor Jerry Apodaca appointed Easley to a seat on the New Mexico Supreme Court vacated by the resignation of Donnan Stephenson, where he was elected to a second term. He retired in 1982 as chief justice.

References

External links

1916 births
2006 deaths
People from Tahlequah, Oklahoma
Justices of the New Mexico Supreme Court
Lieutenant Governors of New Mexico
Members of the New Mexico House of Representatives
New Mexico state senators
New Mexico lawyers
Speakers of the New Mexico House of Representatives
University of Oklahoma College of Law alumni
20th-century American judges
Chief Justices of the New Mexico Supreme Court
20th-century American politicians
20th-century American lawyers
Politicians from Oklahoma